The Espírito Santo gubernatorial election occurred in October 2018, and elected the Governor and Vice Governor of Espírito Santo and 28 State Deputies.

The previous gubernatorial election in the state was held in October 2014, in which Paulo Hartung of the Brazilian Democratic Movement was elected in the first round with 53.44% of the votes, against 39.34% of Renato Casagrande.

Candidates

Potencial candidates

Brazilian Labour Party (PTB) 

 Aridelmo Teixeira - Professor and businessman.

Brazilian Socialist Party (PSB) 

 Renato Casagrande - Governor of Espírito Santo 2011–2015; Senator for Espírito Santo 2007–2011; Federal Deputy from Espírito Santo 2003–2007; State Deputy of Espírito Santo 1991–1995.

Social Liberal Party (PSL) 

 Carlos Manato - Federal Deputy from Espírito Santo 2015–2018.

Socialism and Liberty Party (PSOL) 

 André Moreira - Lawyer.

We Can (PODE) 

 Rose de Freitas - Senator from Espírito Santo since 2015; Federal Deputy from Espírito Santo 2003–2015; State Deputy of Espírito Santo 1983–1987.

Workers' Party (PT) 

 Jackeline Rocha - Micro-entrepreneur.

Declined candidates 

 Amaro Neto (PRB) - State Deputy of Espírito Santo since 2015.
César Colnago - Vice-governor of Espírito Santo since 2015; Federal Deputy from Espírito Santo 2011–2015; State Deputy of Espírito Santo 2003–2011; Councillor of Vitória 1993–2003.
Max Filho (PSDB) - Mayor of Vila Velha since 2017; Federal Deputy from Espírito Santo 2015–2017; State Deputy. 1995–2001.
Paulo Hartung (MDB) - Governor of Espírito Santo 2003–2011 and since 2015; Senator for Espírito Santo 1999–2002; Mayor of Vitória 1993–1997; Federal Deputy from Espírito Santo 1987–1991; State Deputy of Espírito Santo 1983–1987.

Lost in primaries or conventions 

 Carlos Alberto Foresti (PSL) - Former Military Police Lieutenant Colonel.
André Garcia (MDB) - State Secretary of Public Security and Social Defense 2015–2018.

Opinion polls

First round

Second round

References 

2018 Brazilian gubernatorial elections
October 2018 events in South America
2018